The FIS Cross-Country Eastern Europe Cup (EEC) is a series of cross-country skiing events arranged by the International Ski Federation (FIS). It is one of the nine FIS Cross-Country Continental Cups, a second-level competition ranked below the World Cup. The Eastern Europe Cup is open for competitors from all nations, but are mainly a competition for skiers from four nations in Eastern Europe; Belarus, Kazakhstan, Russia and Ukraine. 

The Eastern Europe Cup has been held since the 2007–08 season, and has been a part of the Cross-Country Continental Cup since then.

World Cup qualification
In the end of certain periods, the overall leaders for both genders receive a place in the World Cup in the following period. The overall winners of the season receive a place in the World Cup in the beginning of the following season.

Overall winners

Men

Women

References

External links
Easter Europe Cup 2019–20 Calendar at the International Ski Federation

Eastern Europe Cup
Recurring sporting events established in 2007